Once Upon, a Dog (Once Upon a Time, There Lived a Dog,  (Zhil-byl Pyos)) is a Soviet animated short film adapted from a Ukrainian folk tale.

The cartoon won the first place at the 1983 International Film Festival in Odense and a special prize at the 1983 festival in Annecy.

Plot
The day comes when an old watchdog becomes useless but the masters, being kind, decide not to drive him away. However, they become exasperated when the Dog is indifferent during a burglary. The Dog is kicked out and goes to the forest, where he meets the Wolf, his old enemy. The Dog and the Wolf are both old, so they understand they can't be just enemies forever. The Wolf stages a kidnapping to help his mate and the Dog "rescues" the child. The Dog is welcomed back to the khutor (the farmstead) and continues with his old duty. The winter comes and one evening the Dog hears the howl of the Wolf. The Dog remembers to repay the Wolf's kindness. He helps the Wolf to enter the house where there is a wedding in progress and takes him different kinds of food from the table. Becoming tipsy from the effects of a large meal, alcohol and a warm house, the Wolf starts to howl his "song". The wolf howls and is discovered, but the quick-thinking dog saves him by 'chasing' him from the house. The Wolf thanks the Dog and the best friends bid farewell.

The story reveals the problem of becoming old and useless. It appeals to everyone's ability for mutual readiness to help, despite past history.

Credits
The cartoon repeatedly features the Ukrainian folk songs "Oy tam na hori" ("Oh, there at the mountain") and "Ta kosyv batko, kosyv ya" ("My father and I were mowing") performed by "Drevo" folk choir from Kriachkivka village of Pyriatyn District, Poltava Region. The Dog was voiced by Georgi Burkov and the Wolf by Armen Dzhigarkhanyan. Animators – Anatoly Abarenov, Natalia Bogomolova, Sergey Dezhkin, operator – Mikhail Druyan, sound producer – Andrey Filchikov.

A steel monument to the Wolf was placed in 2005 in Tomsk and a copy was made in 2007 in Angarsk. The monument is unofficially called "Monument to Happiness".

Notes

External links

Music from cartoon (Soundtrack)
YouTube video with English subtitles
IMDb entry

Soyuzmultfilm
1982 films
1982 animated films
Soviet animated films
Animated films about dogs
Animated films about wolves
Animated films about friendship
Films about old age